This is a list of rulers of Wallachia, from the first mention of a medieval polity situated between the Southern Carpathians and the Danube until the union with Moldavia in 1859, which led to the creation of Romania.

Notes
Dynastic rule is hard to ascribe, given the loose traditional definition of the ruling family. On principle, princes were chosen from any family branch, including a previous ruler's bastard sons, being defined as os de domn, "of Voivode marrow", or as having heregie, "heredity" (from the Latin hereditas); the institutions charged with the election, dominated by the boyars, had fluctuating degrees of influence. The system itself was challenged by usurpers, and became obsolete with the Phanariote epoch, when rulers were appointed by the Ottoman Sultans; between 1821 and 1878 (the date of Romania's independence), various systems combining election and appointment were put in practice. Wallachian rulers, like the Moldavian rulers, bore the titles of Voivode ("duke") or/and Hospodar ("lord, master"); when writing in Romanian, the term Domn (from the Latin dominus) was used.

Most rulers did not use the form of the name they are cited with, and several used more than one form of their own name; in some cases, the ruler was only mentioned in foreign sources. The full names are either modern versions or ones based on mentions in various chronicles.

List

Early rulers

 Bezerenbam and Mișelav
 Seneslau
 John (knez)
 Farcaș
 Litovoi
 Bărbat
 Thocomerius

House of Basarab

House of Bogdan-Muşat

Houses of Basarab and Movilă

Various dynasties

See also
List of rulers of Moldavia

Bibliography

External links
Rulers of Wallachia

Rulers of Wallachia
Romania history-related lists
Lists of European rulers
Lists of princes
House of Dănești
House of Drăculești
Lists of Romanian monarchs